Malvern Parker Drury (6 April 1910 – 19 August 1993) was an Australian rules footballer who played for Hawthorn in the Victorian Football League (VFL) and West Torrens in the South Australian National Football League (SANFL).

Drury was a member of the West Torrens premiership team of 1933 and topped their goal-kicking with 34 majors for the year. The following season he was picked up by Hawthorn, coached by Bill Twomey, Sr., and played 15 of a possible 18 games.

He then returned to West Torrens and was made club captain in 1937, before being appointed coach in 1940. Drury oversaw two poor seasons but when the war induced three year recess ended, steered West Torrens to a surprise premiership in 1945. After winning both the Semi Final and Preliminary Final by a kick, the former due to a controversial goal from Jim Thoms, West Torrens took on Port Adelaide in the decider. Having lost just twice during the season, Port Adelaide were the favourites but West Torrens, despite conceding eight first quarter goals, won by 13 points.

Mal Parker died in 1993 and is buried in Enfield Memorial Park.

References

External links

1910 births
Hawthorn Football Club players
West Torrens Football Club players
West Torrens Football Club coaches
Australian rules footballers from South Australia
1993 deaths